The 1934–35 Detroit Red Wings season was the ninth season for the Detroit NHL franchise, third as the Red Wings. The Red Wings finished fourth in the American Division and did not qualify for the playoffs.

Offseason

Regular season

Final standings

Record vs. opponents

Schedule and results

Playoffs
The Red Wings didn't make it into the playoffs

Player statistics

Regular season
Scoring

Goaltending

Note: Pos = Position; GP = Games played; G = Goals; A = Assists; Pts = Points; PIM = Penalty minutes; PPG = Power-play goals; SHG = Short-handed goals; GWG = Game-winning goals
      MIN = Minutes played; W = Wins; L = Losses; T = Ties; GA = Goals-against; GAA = Goals-against average; SO = Shutouts;

Awards and records

Transactions

See also
1934–35 NHL season

References

External links
 

Detroit Red Wings seasons
Detroit
Detroit
Detroit Red Wings
Detroit Red Wings